Take Me to the River is a 2014 American documentary film directed by Martin Shore about music of Memphis, Tennessee. It premiered on March 11, 2014, at SXSW film festival in Austin, Texas. The film was released on Netflix in August 2016, two years after its initial release.

Cast 
Terrence Howard as himself (host/narrator)
Mavis Staples as herself
Snoop Dogg as himself
Alphonzo Bailey as himself
Cedric Coleman as himself
Mario Mims as himself
Benjamin "Lil P-Nut" Flores Jr. as himself
Bobby "Blue" Bland as himself
Charles "Skip" Pitts as himself
William Bell as himself

Soundtrack
Take Me to the River: Music from the Motion Picture was released on September 9, 2014 via Stax Records/Concord Music, and consists of twelve songs.

Sequel
It was announced the upcoming second film entitled Take Me to the River: New Orleans with the confirmed cast of G-Eazy, Mannie Fresh and Mystikal among others.

References

External links
 
 
 
 
 

2014 films
American documentary films
Documentaries about music
Films about music and musicians
Films about race and ethnicity
Films about racism
Films set in Memphis, Tennessee
Films shot in Tennessee
2010s English-language films
2010s American films